Sir Christopher George Nugee (born 23 January 1959), officially styled The Rt Hon. Lord Justice Nugee, is a judge of the Court of Appeal of England and Wales.

The second son of Edward Nugee, he was educated at Radley College before going to Corpus Christi College, Oxford, graduating as BA and was a recipient of the Eldon Scholarship.  He later pursued legal studies at City University (Dip Law).

He was called to the Bar at Inner Temple in 1983 and appointed QC in 1998 before becoming a Bencher of the Inn in 2003.
Nugee was a Justice of the High Court of England and Wales (Chancery Division) from 2013 until 2020, and was appointed Knight Bachelor in the 2014 Special Honours.

He was appointed a Lord Justice of Appeal in October 2020.

In 1991, Nugee married Emily Thornberry, a senior Labour party politician currently serving as Shadow Attorney General. They have three children, and live in Islington, the north London constituency which his wife represents as Member of Parliament.

He is the brother of John Nugee, Andrew Nugee, and Lt Gen Richard Nugee.

References

1959 births
Living people
People from West Sussex
People educated at Radley College
Alumni of Corpus Christi College, Oxford
Alumni of City, University of London
Members of the Inner Temple
20th-century British lawyers
21st-century British lawyers
English barristers
English King's Counsel
20th-century King's Counsel
Chancery Division judges
Knights Bachelor
Lords Justices of Appeal
Members of the Privy Council of the United Kingdom
Spouses of British politicians